Kazaam is the original soundtrack of the 1996 film starring Shaquille O'Neal. The soundtrack was released by Perspective/A&M Records on June 19, 1996. It featured two hit singles, Nathan Morris (of Boyz II Men)'s "Wishes", which made it to number 86 on the Billboard Hot 100 and number 56 on the Hot R&B/Hip-Hop singles & tracks, and Subway's "I'll Make Your Dreams Come True", which made it to number 64 on the Hot R&B/Hip-Hop singles and tracks.

The soundtrack contains P!nk's first professional recording, "Key to My Heart", which was performed by Choice, an all white R&B trio that P!nk was a member of before disbanding the group for a solo career.

Reception
Artists who appeared on the soundtrack included Usher, Lisa "Left Eye" Lopes (of TLC), Immature, Quindon Tarver, DJ Spinderella, Jason Weaver, and Backstreet Boys. Shaquille O'Neal contributed three tracks, which included a duet with co-star Wade J. Robson, who played Elito in the film, entitled "We Genie". The soundtrack has a 3 star rating from AllMusic.

Track listing

References 

Hip hop soundtracks
1996 soundtrack albums
1990s film soundtrack albums
A&M Records soundtracks
Musical film soundtracks
Comedy film soundtracks
Fantasy film soundtracks